Sally Rugg is a Melbourne-based LGBTIQ activist, feminist and political staffer. Rugg was the GetUp creative and campaigns director between 2013 – 2018. Rugg was one of the many public faces of the "YES" campaign in the Australian Marriage Law Postal Survey and also campaigns for Safe Schools. Until her highly publicised dismissal in 2022, Rugg served as the Chief of Staff for Independent Member of Parliament, Monique Ryan.

Early life 
During her early years, Rugg volunteered to work with disadvantaged youth. She then started working at the organisation GetUp, while doing her master's degree in Arts. She attended events in the ACT when same-sex marriage was made legal for six days, which she says informed her views.

Awards and recognition 
Rugg has won numerous awards due to her campaigning for the YES same-sex marriage vote. There is a room named after Rugg in Oxford Street, Sydney named "The Sally Rugg LGBTIQ Pride Room". In 2018, Rugg was awarded the FBi Radio SMAC of the Year award for her work on the YES same-sex marriage campaign and Strayan of the Year by Pedestrian.tv, for her efforts in the YES campaign. and was a finalist for Hero of the Year at the Australian LGBTI Awards. In 2017, Sally was named among Harper’s Bazaar’s 5 Women of The Year, by Cosmopolitan magazine as one of Australia’s Most Influential LGBTIQ people, ranked first in Mammamia’s Most Powerful LGBTIQ Women list, by Amnesty International’s Top 15 Women Championing Human Rights In Australia. Sally was awarded the Young Achiever Award at the 2016 Honour Awards.

Rugg was a finalist for the Honour Awards Young Achiever Award in 2015, was named among the 23 LGBT Australians to Watch in 2016 by SX Magazine and the Top 40 Under Forty by TimeOut, and won the New South Wales Honour Awards Young Achiever Award in 2016.

Personal life 
Rugg self-identifies as gay. She lives in Melbourne and is engaged to comedian Kate McCartney.

Writing 
Rugg writes regularly on activism and feminism, as well as LGBTIQ and human rights. Rugg's work has been published in media including The Sydney Morning Herald, The Guardian, Vice, Pedestrian as well as Junkee. Rugg was a contributing author for books including The Full Catastrophe, (2019) as well as Growing Up Queer in Australia, (2019).

Her first book, How Powerful We Are: Behind the scenes with one of Australia's leading activists, is her narrative about legalizing same-sex marriage.

Dispute with Monique Ryan

References

Australian LGBT rights activists
Living people
Australian women activists
Australian women writers
Australian writers
Women civil rights activists
1988 births